William Francis MacKinnon (December 19, 1919 – March 13, 1990) was a Canadian politician. He represented the electoral district of Antigonish in the Nova Scotia House of Assembly from 1956 to 1970. He was a member of the Progressive Conservative Party of Nova Scotia.

Born in 1919 at Antigonish, Nova Scotia, MacKinnon was a graduate of St. Francis Xavier University. He married Agnes Campbell, and was a radio news editor by career. MacKinnon entered provincial politics in the 1956 election, defeating Liberal cabinet minister Colin H. Chisholm by 215 votes in the Antigonish riding. He was re-elected in the 1960, 1963, and 1967 elections. MacKinnon did not reoffer in the 1970 election. MacKinnon died on March 13, 1990.

References

1919 births
1990 deaths
Progressive Conservative Association of Nova Scotia MLAs
People from Antigonish, Nova Scotia
St. Francis Xavier University alumni